Bohdan Mykolayovych Shershun (born 14 May 1981) is a Ukrainian football defender. He has competed in international competitions for the Ukraine national football team. He signed 2+1 years contract with FC Arsenal Kyiv on 21 July 2010.

Honours
CSKA Moscow
Russian Football Premier League (2): 2003, 2005
Russian Cup (2): 2002, 2005
Russian Super Cup (1): 2004
UEFA Cup (1): 2005
UEFA Super Cup: Runners-up (1): 2005

Ukraine 
UEFA European Under-19 Championship: Runners-up (1): 2000

See also
 2001 FIFA World Youth Championship squads#Ukraine

References

External links
 
Bohdan Shershun at Official FFU Site 

1981 births
Living people
Ukrainian footballers
Ukraine international footballers
Ukraine youth international footballers
Ukraine under-21 international footballers
FC Dnipro players
PFC CSKA Moscow players
UEFA Cup winning players
FC Arsenal Kyiv players
Russian Premier League players
Ukrainian Premier League players
Ukrainian expatriate footballers
Expatriate footballers in Russia
Sportspeople from Khmelnytskyi, Ukraine
FC Kryvbas Kryvyi Rih players
FC Volyn Lutsk players
Ukrainian expatriate sportspeople in Russia
Association football defenders